The Wikatinda were an indigenous Australian people of the Cape York Peninsula of northern Queensland. They were one of the Wik peoples, but their language is unattested.

Country

People
By the writing of Tindale's writing (1974) he stated that the Wikatinda were 'virtually extinct'.

Alternative names
 Adinda
 Wik Tinda

Source:

Notes

Citations

Sources

Aboriginal peoples of Queensland